Leuconostoc falkenbergense  is a bacterium from the genus of Leuconostoc.

References

Lactobacillaceae
Bacteria described in 2020